The Korean invasion of Manchuria was a Korean invasion of Manchuria. Beginning on 11 August 1902, when Gojong of Korea appointed Yi Bum-yun as the observer of Jiandao, the attack ended up with the victory of Korea, bringing control of Jiandao to some extent.

Background 
From the 1860s, Koreans living in Hamgyong Province moved to Jiandao to avoid famine. In 1885 and 1887, Qing and Joseon had conferences about their borders. Qing desired to expel Koreans living in Jiandao. However, these conferences between the two governments were not successful in concluding the issues of Jiandao. 

Struggle about Jiandao was heightened after the proclamation of the Korean Empire. Several presses such as Jeguk Sinmun, and Tongnip Sinmun addressed problems of people and territory again. Moreover, Observer of the North Hamgyung Province Cho Chon-woo reported that because the Tomun river flows past the Jeung mountain, and to the Songhua River, East to the Tomun river, and South to the Jeung mountain belongs to Korea.

When the Russian military forces captured Manchuria during the Boxer Rebellion, Korea sought it as an opportunity to solve the border conflicts with Qing. At the south of the Tumen River, Korea established Jinwidae and police officers.  Korea deployed a battalion with 150 soldiers in Jongseung, 200 soldiers in Musan County, 200 soldiers in Hoeryong, 100 more soldiers in Jongseung, 100 soldiers in Onsong County, and 50 soldiers in Kyongwon County. Jinwidae's border defense was rigorous, so Qing officials could not control Koreans anymore. As the police forces were deployed in Jiandao, the purpose of Jinwidae was changed to the security of the borders. 

The police office was established in March 1901. Two hundred police officers were deployed in Jiandao. The police office divided Jiandao into five subdivisions: North Jiandao, Jongseong Jiandao, Hoeryong Jiandao, Musan Jiandao, and Gyeongwon Jiandao. In 1902, Korea deployed Yi Bum-yun as the Observer to Jiandao to increase their control over the territory.

Invasion 
Yi realized that without violence, protecting Koreans was impossible; therefore, he decided to establish a volunteer army. From September 1903, Yi started to establish an armed force and dug extensive trenches between Bongcheon (which is now Shenyang), Manchuria, and Jilin, and Gando. He employed Russian instructors to train the army and purchased 500 guns from Seoul. The Korean government supported the volunteer army of Yi because of Gojong's desire to control Jiandao and the support of Yi Yong-ik. According to a Qing official, the violence of the Korean army was the following. On 4 September 1903, 1,000 Korean soldiers passed the Yalu River. These Korean soldiers burned and plundered Chinese territory across the Yalu River. On 2 October 1903, 700-800 Korean soldiers invaded a County office in Linjiang people. TTo prevent further conflict with China, the Korean government decided to summon Yi in 1904. Yi disobeyed the order of the Korean government, and instead, he led his forces to Primorsky Krai, where he joined many Korean independence activists such as Choe Jae-hyeong and An Jung-geun.

Aftermath 
After the invasion, Koreans started to recognize Jiandao as the territory of Korea. The Korean Daily News addressed Jiandao as the territory of Korea. In the map of Korea in 1907, Jiandao was included as the territory of Korea. However, as Japan started to interfere border problem in Manchuria, the Korean Daily News changed its stance. Professor Yi Tae-jin of Seoul University asserted that Koreans viewed the Japanese interference as an invasion since the Japanese and Russians were fighting in the Russo-Japanese War. The dispute ended with the Gando Convention signed by Japan. By the Gando Convention, China claimed Jiandao again.

References

Further reading

See also
 Boxer Rebellion
 Military of the Korean Empire
 Jinwidae
 Gando

1902 in Korea
1903 in Korea
1904 in Korea
1902 in China
1903 in China
1904 in China
Invasions by Korea
Invasions of China
Military history of Manchuria